The Pinball Hall of Fame is a museum for pinball machines that opened in Las Vegas, Nevada in November 2009. It is located at 4925 S. Las Vegas Boulevard. The museum is a project of the Las Vegas Pinball Collectors Club, and it features pinball machines from all eras, including some very rare machines such as Williams' Black Gold, Bally's Pinball Circus and Recreativos Franco's Impacto.  It features nearly 700 different pinball games, including some classic video arcade games and other novelty machines of the past and present.

The Pinball Hall of Fame is a nonprofit venture and its creation came about in part due to donations, which are still accepted. The museum is run by Tim Arnold, a veteran arcade operator who ran "Pinball Pete's" in East Lansing, Michigan. Fully staffed by volunteers, excess revenues are donated to the Salvation Army.

History
Since 1990, Tim Arnold has been busy with this project, raising money selling DVDs (and VHS tapes) about pinball repair and organizing pinball 'fun nights' at his own house. There he also has a very large personal collection of pinball machines.

The Pinball Hall of Fame was originally located at 3300 E Tropicana Ave, Las Vegas NV 89121 and featured approximately 200 pinball machines, classic video games and arcade games. This original location opened in February 2006. In late 2009, the Pinball Hall of Fame moved to 1610 E Tropicana Ave.

In 2016, Arnold denied reports he was looking for a successor or he would close the museum. Instead there are plans to expand The Pinball Hall of Fame by constructing a new building on a next door lot to the east of the present building.

In 2020, the Pinball Hall of Fame announced plans to move to a new, larger location at 4925 S Las Vegas Blvd. The new location, a purpose-built 28,000 square foot warehouse, is intended to house the Hall of Fame's complete collection of more than 700 games. Similar to the prior locations, the new location plans to be non-smoking, rideshare-friendly, and provide free parking. However, due to the widespread closure of public venues due to the COVID-19 pandemic, The Pinball Hall of Fame's economic situation was severely compromised, with the future of the museum in jeopardy. To raise necessary funds to complete the new building, move the collection, and keep the museum operating, Arnold and the museum launched a GoFundMe campaign in January 2021.

The Pinball Hall of Fame opened in its Las Vegas Blvd location on April 15, 2021.  On July 1, 2021, the Pinball Hall of Fame had its official grand opening at its new location.

Gallery

See also
Ed Krynski, member of the Hall of Fame
Pacific Pinball Museum, in Alameda, California

References

External links 
www.pinballhall.org The official website
www.pinballmuseum.org A second official website
Current Inventory As of 12/8/2010 current working pinball inventory on the PHoF floor.

Pinball museums
Buildings and structures in Paradise, Nevada
Amusement museums in the United States
Museums in the Las Vegas Valley
History museums in Nevada
Halls of fame in Nevada